Louis Uccellini is a meteorologist and the current Permanent Representative of the United States for the World Meteorological Organization. He is the former director of the US National Weather Service (NWS) from 2013 to 2021. He was also director of the National Centers for Environmental Prediction.

Background
Uccellini received his PhD from the University of Wisconsin-Madison in 1977. He received his master's and bachelor's degrees from there as well. He was head of the Mesoscale Analysis and Modeling Section for Goddard Space Flight Center. Then he became chief of the National Weather Service's Meteorological Operations Division, followed by Director of the NWS' Office of Meteorology.

During his time as Director of the NWS, he worked to improve relationships with emergency management through Impact Based Decision Support Services and worked to restructure the budget. He also promoted the Weather Ready Nation Ambassador Program. Much of his work also involved the process of applying research to operational forecasting.

Bibliography
Northeast Snowstorms
Snowstorms Along the Northeastern Coast of the United States: 1955 to 1985 (with Paul Kocin)

See also
Ken Graham

References

American meteorologists
Living people
Year of birth missing (living people)
National Weather Service people